The American Board of Pediatrics (ABP) was founded in 1933. It is one of the 24 certifying boards of the American Board of Medical Specialties (ABMS). The ABP is an independent and nonprofit organization. The ABP's mission is to advance child health by certifying pediatricians who meet standards of excellence and are committed to continuous learning and improvement.

Certificates awarded
The ABP awards certificates in the following pediatric subspecialty areas:

 General Pediatrics
 Adolescent Medicine
 Cardiology
 Child Abuse Pediatrics
Critical Care Medicine
 Developmental-Behavioral Pediatrics
 Emergency Medicine
 Endocrinology
 Gastroenterology
 Hematology-Oncology
 Hospital Medicine
 Infectious Diseases
 Neonatal-Perinatal Medicine
 Nephrology
 Pulmonology
 Rheumatology

The American Board of Pediatrics also awards certificates in conjunction with other specialty boards. Those certificates include:

 Hospice and Palliative Medicine
 Medical Toxicology
 Pediatric Transplant Hepatology
 Sleep Medicine
 Sports Medicine
Additionally, from 2001-2007, the ABP awarded certificates in Neurodevelopmental Disabilities.

History
In 1933, the American Pediatric Society, the American Academy of Pediatrics, and the American Medical Association formed the American Board of Pediatrics for the purpose of examining and awarding certification to physicians who have superior knowledge in the field of the diseases of childhood.

References

External links
 
 
 

Pediatric organizations
Medical associations based in the United States
Organizations established in 1933
Pediatrics in the United States
Medical and health organizations based in North Carolina